San Antonio del Monte is also a subdivision of Garafía in the island of La Palma in the Canary Islands

San Antonio del Monte (Spanish for "Saint Anthony of the mountain") is a municipality in the Sonsonate department of El Salvador. The town was founded at the beginning of the 18th century by the friars of the convent of Santo Domingo of Sonsonate. It is located at 230 meters of height and at a kilometer to the west of the city of Las Palmeras. The image of San Antonio has always possessed a miraculous fame since maidens in their prayers request for a boyfriend to marry. 

The current beautiful temple initiated its construction on January 20, 1841, initiated by the Friar Jeronimo Zelaya, and the funds were under the administration of the priest Miguel Rosales. The construction cost around 50,000 colones. It was blessed and inaugurated on January 30, 1861 with the concurrence of the president of the Republic, Captain General Gerardo Barrios.

Church of San Antonio del Monte

It is located in the town of San Antonio Del Monte; head of the municipality that belongs to the district and department of Sonsonate. It is located at a kilometer of Sonsonate city, at 230 meters over sea level.

The construction of the temple began on January 20, 1841, and the construction was finished on January 30, 1861. It is not known who built it, but it was initiated by the Friar Jeronimo Zelaya. The church is surrounded by an atrium; its facade is of altarpiece type, divided in two bodies by a very marked entablature. The body is decorated by two couples of paired columns of Corinth style and with decorations in oval form amid the couples of columns. In the superior body, the decorations consist on some pillars, and are finished off by three arches; those of the extreme are decorated with rosettes and the arch of the center with the shield of the order of the Dominicos, which are in turn crowned with a cross.

The roof is crowned by a dome in the sacristy and in the steeple. This dome is finished off by lanterns. The lateral accesses are framed by two couples of columns and a frontispiece.

In the municipal report of November 25, 1856, the following is read: “It is of noticing that you are building a new temple with the product of charities and in little time will be finished. The construction is completely of calicanto”. Indeed on January 30, 1861, the construction ended.

San Antonio del Monte was founded by Dominicos friars at the beginning of the 18th century. In the year 1733, Dominicos monks began to build a hermitage in that place, which was consecrated to San Antonio of Padua, sanctuary that was inaugurated and blessed on August 4, 1749, by the Vicar Friar Antonio Calvo. (El Salvador, History of their towns, villages, and cities; by Jorge Larde y Larín).

The patron festivities take place on June 13 in honor of San Antonio and the commercial party on the third Sunday of August, when the famous encounter of “Cumpas” is carried out. 

Municipalities of the Sonsonate Department